Euseius citrifolius is a species of mite in the family Phytoseiidae.

References

citrifolius
Articles created by Qbugbot
Animals described in 1970